Rickia is a genus of fungi in the family Laboulbeniaceae. The genus contain 132 species.

The genus name of Rickia is in honour of Johann Rick (known in Portuguese as João Evangelista Rick) (1869–1946), who was an Austrian-Brazilian teacher, clergyman and Botanist (Mycology). He taught Mathematics and Natural history between 1903-1915 at the Jesuit School in São Leopoldo, in Rio Grande do Sul in Brazil. 

The genus was circumscribed by Fridiano Cavara in Malpighia vol.13 on page 182 in 1899.

Species
As accepted by Species Fungorum;

Rickia admirabilis 
Rickia africana 
Rickia aloisii 
Rickia ancylopi 
Rickia anomala 
Rickia anthribidicola 
Rickia apiculifera 
Rickia appendicifera 
Rickia arachnoidea 
Rickia arcuata 
Rickia argentinensis 
Rickia arimensis 
Rickia aulachochiri 
Rickia berlesiana 
Rickia bifida 
Rickia biseriata 
Rickia borneoensis 
Rickia candelabriformis 
Rickia carpanetoi 
Rickia celaenopsidis 
Rickia cifoneae 
Rickia circopis 
Rickia circumdata 
Rickia coelostomatis 
Rickia coleopterophagi 
Rickia compressa 
Rickia coprighis 
Rickia coptengalis 
Rickia cornuti 
Rickia corylophidorum 
Rickia cristata 
Rickia danaealis 
Rickia dendroiuli 
Rickia depauperata 
Rickia dichotoma 
Rickia discopomae 
Rickia discreta 
Rickia dominicensis 
Rickia elegans 
Rickia elliptica 
Rickia encymonalis 
Rickia episcaphae 
Rickia episcaphulae 
Rickia eumorphi 
Rickia europsis 
Rickia euxesti 
Rickia euzerconalis 
Rickia excavata 
Rickia fainii 
Rickia fastigiata 
Rickia filifera 
Rickia flagellifera 
Rickia furcata 
Rickia galatheae 
Rickia georgii 
Rickia gigas 
Rickia gracilis 
Rickia gryllotalpae 
Rickia haytiensis 
Rickia huggertii 
Rickia hyalina 
Rickia hyperborea 
Rickia hypoaspidis 
Rickia inclinata 
Rickia inclusa 
Rickia introversa 
Rickia jacobsonii 
Rickia javanica 
Rickia kamerunana 
Rickia kawasakii 
Rickia kistneri 
Rickia laboulbenioides 
Rickia latior 
Rickia lenoirii 
Rickia leonis 
Rickia leptaulacis 
Rickia lophophora 
Rickia lordithonis 
Rickia lycopodinae 
Rickia macrandra 
Rickia macrochelis 
Rickia mamillata 
Rickia megisthani 
Rickia minuta 
Rickia minutissima 
Rickia mycetinae 
Rickia nephanis 
Rickia nigella 
Rickia nigrescens 
Rickia nigriceps 
Rickia nigrofimbriata 
Rickia nipponensis 
Rickia nutans 
Rickia obcordata 
Rickia obelostrepti 
Rickia oceana 
Rickia odontopygidarum 
Rickia onthophagi 
Rickia pachyiuli 
Rickia pachylaelapis 
Rickia pallescens 
Rickia pallida 
Rickia pallodina 
Rickia papuana 
Rickia parasiti 
Rickia parvula 
Rickia passalina 
Rickia perlata 
Rickia peyerimhoffii 
Rickia phalacri 
Rickia phloeonomi 
Rickia pinnata 
Rickia platessa 
Rickia pocadii 
Rickia polonica 
Rickia proliferans 
Rickia proteini 
Rickia ptiliidarum 
Rickia pulchra 
Rickia radiata 
Rickia rhacomycoides 
Rickia rhynchophora 
Rickia rostellata 
Rickia rostrata 
Rickia rotundata 
Rickia sakaii 
Rickia sakkae 
Rickia sarawakensis 
Rickia saulae 
Rickia scydmaeni 
Rickia serrulata 
Rickia seticola 
Rickia setifera 
Rickia siddhartha 
Rickia silvestrii 
Rickia spathulata 
Rickia sphindidorum 
Rickia stellata 
Rickia stenotarsi 
Rickia sugiyamae 
Rickia tachini 
Rickia taiwanensis 
Rickia tessellata 
Rickia tomari 
Rickia trichophora 
Rickia trinitatis 
Rickia uncigeri 
Rickia uncinata 
Rickia uropodae 
Rickia wasmannii 
Rickia wulaiensis 
Rickia yoshii 
Rickia zanettii

Former species
Moved species still within the Laboulbeniaceae family;
 R. formicicola  now Dimorphomyces formicicola 
 R. lispini  = Diaphoromyces lispini
 R. lispini  = Rickia sugiyamae
 R. marginata  = Diaphoromyces marginatus
 R. megisthani var. trachyuropodae  = Rickia megisthani
 R. melanophthalmae  = Benjaminiomyces melanophthalmae
 R. perpusilla  = Benjaminiomyces perpusillus
 R. platensis  = Benjaminiomyces platensis
 R. pumila  = Benjaminiomyces pumilus
 R. zirophori  = Diaphoromyces zirophori

References

External links

Laboulbeniaceae
Laboulbeniales genera